Nguyễn Minh Châu (born January 9, 1985) is a retired  Vietnamese footballer who played as a midfielder for Hải Phòng and was a member of Vietnam national football team.

Life 
Nguyen Minh Chau was born in a family of 7 children. He is the youngest, being the brother of 6 sisters. After graduating at Grade 12, Chau left Hai Phong to work in the U21 youth team.

Career
At age of 17, Chau moved to Hai Phong from his home town of Quang Ninh to join the youth team of Hải Phòng. He later promote to the senior team to attend V-League. In 2008, coach Henrique Calisto called up Chau to attend the 2008 AFF Suzuki Cup with the Vietnam national football team. Then, he was a member of the Vietnamese team wins first AFF Championship title. In 2009, Nguyen Minh Chau was still attached to Haiphong Cement.

At the end of 2017, Minh Chau has finally announced his retirement.He is known as a legend in Haiphong FC for 14 years played for the club with 294 appearances. Now he is living in Australia with his family.

Honours

Vietnam

ASEAN Football Championship

 Champions : 2008

References

Vietnamese footballers
1985 births
Living people
V.League 1 players
Haiphong FC players
Vietnam international footballers
People from Quảng Ninh province
Association football midfielders